Rock of Ages is a 2012 American jukebox musical comedy film directed by Adam Shankman and based on the rock jukebox Broadway musical Rock of Ages by Chris D'Arienzo. Starring Julianne Hough and Diego Boneta in his film debut leading an ensemble cast that includes Russell Brand, Alec Baldwin, Paul Giamatti, Catherine Zeta-Jones, Malin Åkerman, Mary J. Blige, Bryan Cranston and Tom Cruise, the film features the music of many 1980s rock artists including Def Leppard, Journey, Scorpions, Poison, Foreigner, Guns N' Roses, Pat Benatar, Joan Jett, Bon Jovi, Twisted Sister, Whitesnake, REO Speedwagon, and others.

Originally scheduled to enter production in summer 2009 for a 2011 release, it eventually commenced production in May 2011 and was released on June 15, 2012. The film received mixed critical reviews and was a box-office bomb, grossing only $59 million worldwide on a $75 million budget. However, Cruise was particularly lauded for his performances of "Pour Some Sugar on Me" and "Wanted Dead or Alive". The related film soundtrack was also well-received, debuting at #1 on the Billboard Top Soundtracks chart.

Plot
In 1987 Los Angeles, Sherrie Christian arrives from Oklahoma with dreams of becoming a singer. Barback Drew Boley prepares for another night at The Bourbon Room ("Sister Christian/Just Like Paradise/Nothin' But a Good Time"). Sherrie's suitcase is stolen, and Drew gets her a job as a waitress at the Bourbon Room.

Desperate to save the club from a tax debt, the club's owner Dennis Dupree and his right-hand man Lonny Barnett book Stacee Jaxx, a detached and self-indulgent rock star preparing for his final gig with his band, Arsenal. Drew tells Sherrie his own dreams of becoming a rock star, but that he has stagefright ("Juke Box Hero/I Love Rock 'n' Roll"). Learning of Stacee's upcoming concert, Patricia Whitmore, the conservative wife of mayor Mike Whitmore, organizes a protest in front of the club ("Hit Me with Your Best Shot").

Drew and Sherrie have their first date at the Hollywood Sign, where Drew reveals he is writing a song for Sherrie ("Don't Stop Believin'"). On the night of Arsenal's final show, Dennis learns the opening act has cancelled; Sherrie convinces him to use Drew's band, Wolfgang Von Colt ("More Than Words/Heaven"). Stacee's manager, Paul Gill, schedules an interview with Constance Sack, a reporter for Rolling Stone.

Constance mentions rumors of Stacee's difficult behavior and implies he was kicked out of Arsenal, which Stacee denies ("Wanted Dead or Alive"). Stacee sends Sherrie for a bottle of scotch from his limo. Constance lashes out at the once-great Stacee; they recognize their mutual attraction and are about to have sex when Stacee sings ("I Want to Know What Love Is"). Ashamed, Constance leaves as Sherrie enters and collides with Stacee. Drew mistakenly believes that Sherrie and Stacee had sex, and is angrily inspired to sing ("I Wanna Rock") for the opening act. Drew and Sherrie break up and she quits the Bourbon Room. Paul, impressed with his performance, offers Drew a record deal as Arsenal sings their last song of the night ("Pour Some Sugar on Me").

Sherrie takes refuge at a strip club, the Venus Club, where owner Justice Charlier offers her a job as a dancer ("Shadows of the Night/Harden My Heart"), but Sherrie chooses to wait tables. She realizes she needs more money, as Drew signs to Gill's record label ("Here I Go Again"). Dennis worries the Bourbon Room will close and that he has disappointed everyone. Lonny confesses his love for him, and Dennis reciprocates ("Can't Fight This Feeling"). Drew realizes his record deal makes him part of hip-hop boy band "The Zee Guys" as Joshua Zee, while Sherrie decides to become a dancer at the Venus Club ("Any Way You Want It").

Sherrie visits the Hollywood Sign, where she finds Drew, whose life has also not gone as planned. She tells him she did not have sex with Stacee and will be returning to Oklahoma. They part ways, lamenting their situation ("Every Rose Has Its Thorn").

Stacee realizes his feelings for Constance and calls Rolling Stone to learn that she is covering his show at The Bourbon Room. Stacee rushes to the venue, where Lonny leads the patrons against Patricia's protest group ("We're Not Gonna Take It/We Built This City"). Stacee recognizes Patricia, whom Lonny exposes as a former Arsenal groupie. Drew buys back Sherrie's stolen records and drops them off at the strip club.

As the Zee Guys are rejected by the crowd at the Bourbon Room, Drew spots Sherrie in the audience and leaves the stage. They reconcile, and Drew fires Paul. Sherrie reunites Wolfgang Von Colt onstage, where she and Drew perform the song he wrote for her ("Don't Stop Believin'"). Stacee, having sex with Constance in the bathroom, is moved by the song.

Eight months later, Stacee has rejoined Arsenal and performs the song with Drew and Sherrie, now part of Wolfgang Von Colt, at Dodger Stadium in front of a crowd including Dennis, Lonny, Justice, a pregnant Constance, and Patricia, who has returned to her rock 'n' roll persona.

Cast
 Julianne Hough as Sherrie Christian
 Diego Boneta as Drew Boley
 Russell Brand as Lonny Barnett
 Paul Giamatti as Paul Gill
 Catherine Zeta-Jones as Patricia Whitmore
 Malin Åkerman as Constance Sack
 Mary J. Blige as Justice Charlier
 Alec Baldwin as Dennis Dupree
 Tom Cruise as Stacee Jaxx
 Bryan Cranston as Mayor Mike Whitmore
 Will Forte as Mitch Miley

Additionally, Kevin Nash and Jeff Chase starred as Jaxx's bodyguards. Constantine Maroulis, who played Drew in the original Broadway cast, appears as the Capitol Records executive during "Any Way You Want It". 

Several 1980s musicians also made cameo appearances throughout the film, including Kevin Cronin of REO Speedwagon, Sebastian Bach of Skid Row, Debbie Gibson, Nuno Bettencourt of Extreme, Joel Hoekstra of Night Ranger and Porcelain Black, during "We Built This City/We're Not Gonna Take It". 

Eli Roth makes an appearance as Stefano, the Zee Guys' music video director, and T. J. Miller appears as a Rolling Stone receptionist.

Production

Development
After the success of the original Off-Broadway production, the film rights were sold to Warner Bros. and New Line Cinema in early 2009. Adam Shankman was hired to direct the film in October that year. Chris D'Arienzo, creator of the stage musical, revealed he was originally attached to write and direct the film, wishing to have it visualised as similar to Metro-Goldwyn-Mayer musicals such as Singin' in the Rain, however the studio elected to hire someone they felt they could trust with the budget they wanted to give the film, resulting in Shankman's hiring.

Casting

Tom Cruise played Stacee Jaxx in the film. Shankman knew Cruise was in when he heard him on the first go around of his voice lesson, confirming he "actually has a fantastic voice." Cruise had been singing five hours a day to prepare for his work as musician Stacee Jaxx. "It's this brilliant mashup, it seems, of Axl Rose, Bret Michaels, Keith Richards and Jim Morrison," Shankman said of what to expect from Cruise. All of the actors sing their own parts in the film. Cruise said that he had always wanted to appear in a musical but he found the idea frightening because he was uncertain whether he could actually pull it off.

On February 14, 2011, it was announced that Mary J. Blige had signed on to play Justice Charler in the film. On March 3, 2011, it was confirmed that Julianne Hough would play the role of Sherrie, Drew's love interest. On March 6, 2011, it was confirmed that Alec Baldwin would play the role of Dennis Dupree in the film. Baldwin's agreement to star in the film prompted Warner Bros. to have the film fast-tracked. On March 24, 2011, it was announced that Paul Giamatti would be in the film, playing the manager of Stacee Jaxx.

Pretty Little Liars star Diego Boneta was confirmed to play the male protagonist, Drew Boley, on April 5, 2011. Not wanting an older actor to act like he is 23, Shankman thought it better to go as authentic as possible, "and Diego is absolutely that. He is [a] kid who came to Los Angeles with a dream and who sings and has an amazing voice, and drive. And he's also as honest and sweet as you can possibly make him and he's authentically the age. It creates a piece of something on screen that I don't have to fabricate." Of Boneta's audition, Shankman said, "It's that feeling you get when you realized you've discovered lightning in a bottle. It reminds me of when Zac Efron auditioned for Hairspray, Channing Tatum for Step Up, and Liam Hemsworth auditioned for The Last Song. When the guy walks in, the guy walks in!" Shankman also said he did not know that Boneta was a Latin music star until after he auditioned. "I have since seen him on stage and in his concerts, and he totally owns the room," Shankman said. 

Constantine Maroulis (Drew Boley from the musical) made a cameo appearance in the film like Ricki Lake did for Hairspray. On April 13, Russell Brand was confirmed to portray Lonny. 

Catherine Zeta-Jones joined the cast on April 20, and portrayed an original character added to the story line. The unnamed character is described as "the Villainess of the movie" who "wants to shut down rock’n roll in the great city of Los Angeles." On May 1 Bryan Cranston joined the cast as the Mayor of Los Angeles, who is the husband of Catherine Zeta-Jones's character, and Malin Åkerman completed the cast when she was added as Constance Sack on May 3, 2011, a role Anne Hathaway and Amy Adams declined.

Singer Porcelain Black made a cameo in the film, playing a 1980s hair metal singer. She performed one of the sole original tracks for the film, "Rock Angels". "Rock Angels" was written and composed by Adam Anders and Desmond Child. Professional wrestler Kevin Nash played Stacee's bodyguard.

Filming
Principal photography began at Revolution Live, a small music venue in Fort Lauderdale. Scenes were shot at a Hollywood, Florida beach on May 24. The scenes at the iconic Hollywood Sign were filmed at the Monarch Hill Renewable Energy Park in Pompano Beach. 

In June 2011, a full six-block section of N.W. 14th Street in Downtown Miami was decorated as a late 1980s version set of the Hollywood, California Sunset Strip complete with the Whisky a Go Go, Frederick's of Hollywood, Tower Records, Angelyne Billboard along with other landmarks. 

On July 18, filming took place at the Hard Rock Casino in Hollywood, Florida, for a concert scene with "Don't Stop Believin'" and "Wanted Dead or Alive".

Release
The film is distributed by New Line Cinema via Warner Bros. It had its world premiere in Los Angeles on June 8, 2012, where rock bands Def Leppard and Poison performed, and was released theatrically on June 15, 2012.

Box office
On its opening weekend in theaters, the film grossed $14,447,269, ranking third place, behind the previous week's holdovers Madagascar 3: Europe's Most Wanted and Prometheus. The film did, however, do slightly better business than the other newcomer, That's My Boy.

Rock of Ages was a box office bomb, grossing $38,518,613 in North America and $20,900,000 in other territories for a worldwide total of $59,418,613, failing to bring back its $75 million budget. However, the film still has the seventh-highest opening ever for a musical.

In a 2019 interview, Adam Shankman said "I think it would have been huge if it had been something that was made for streaming. Here are the problems with what Rock of Ages was. I think it was released on a very complicated date. We were in the early summer days, there were marketing challenges to do with the cast, but that wasn’t their fault," he explained. "The cast all loved it, and Tom Cruise really wanted to feel like an ensemble member and Warner Brothers wanted to put the whole thing on him. He wasn’t a problem at all; he just had a real point of view. Then there was the other piece of it which was there was a misguided belief that you could market musicals to men as opposed to going the whole hog and making the movie more of a romantic fantasy. It's a weird cult movie. I kept calling one of those guys and saying, ‘I think I’m making like a really expensive cult movie over here,’ and they were like, ‘No, no, it’s great! You made Hairspray!’ and my reaction was, ‘I don’t know. This isn’t really about ending racism. Rock of Ages is something else entirely.’ It has a lot of joy in it, but the story isn't really solid, so it's just a lot of fun, right?"

Critical reception

The film received mixed reviews from critics, and has a critical score of 42% on Rotten Tomatoes based on 228 reviews, with an average rating of 6/10. The site's consensus states: "Its exuberant silliness is almost enough to make up for its utter inconsequentiality, but Rock of Ages is ultimately too bland and overlong to justify its trip to the big screen." Metacritic reports a 47 out of 100 rating, based on 42 critics, indicating "mixed or average reviews". Audiences polled by CinemaScore gave the film an average grade of "B" on an A+ to F scale.

Several critics gave praise to the performances, particularly that of Cruise as Stacee Jaxx. Peter Travers of Rolling Stone wrote: "Rock of Ages is pretty fun despite a terrible script, bland leads and awful wigs, mainly thanks to a performance by Tom Cruise as fictional hair metal rocker Stacee Jaxx." Writing for the San Francisco Chronicle, Amy Biancolli called his performance "a revelation", calling it a "reminder that he's always at his best in wildly transformative character parts". Steve Persall of the Tampa Bay Times praised Cruise's singing, and compared his performance to his earlier work as Lestat in Interview with the Vampire. In her review, Dana Stevens of Slate found Cruise's performance the "boldest use of the actor since Paul Thomas Anderson made him a rage-fueled motivational speaker in Magnolia".

As for the negative reviews, Rex Reed of The New York Observer was heavily critical of every aspect of the film, giving the film no stars out of his ranking of four and compared the film to Battlefield Earth and Howard the Duck. Writing for The Guardian, Peter Bradshaw derided the film, and the stage musical, as "bland and tiring". Bradshaw also criticized Russell Brand's accent, and gave slight praise to Cruise's performance. Claudia Puig, of USA Today, criticised the main leads of the film as "deadly dull dreamers" and the story as "tame and tone deaf". Richard Corliss for Time found the cast as being wasted in the film, highlighting Baldwin, Zeta-Jones, Cranston, and Cruise, to whose performance Corliss provided positive reception.

Rock of Ages creator Chris D'Arienzo, though having not seen the film adaptation, spoke negatively on the final product. "When the trailer came out, I saw there was a monkey in it, and then I knew what kind of movie it was. And I think America knew what sort of movie it was". D'Arienzo voiced disappointment in how the film depicted itself, stating,

Alec Baldwin, who played Dennis Dupree in the film, was also critical, calling it "a horrible movie" and "a complete disaster". Baldwin had asked New Line Cinema studio head Toby Emmerich to replace him in his role shortly before the beginning of production.

Accolades

Home media
Rock of Ages was released on DVD and Blu-ray on October 9, 2012. An extended cut is available on the Blu-ray, which includes the deleted "Rock You Like a Hurricane" lap dance scene between Stacee Jaxx (Tom Cruise) and Sherrie (Julianne Hough), which is also played in the theatrical version's end credits, as well as an extended version of "Waiting for a Girl Like You", between Drew (Diego Boneta) and Sherrie (Hough) (both scenes can also be found on YouTube). The extended cut runs 136 minutes, 13 minutes longer than the theatrical version, and is rated R for sexual content, as opposed to the PG-13 theatrical version.

Soundtrack

The cover and track listing of the soundtrack was confirmed by Entertainment Weekly on April 30, 2012. The soundtrack was released on June 5, 2012.  It debuted at No. 15 on Billboard 200, and peaked at No. 5 on that chart in its third week.  It also debuted at No. 1 on the Top Soundtracks chart.  It sold 267,000 copies in the US in 2012, making it the second best-selling soundtrack album of the year. It had sold 320,000 copies as of May 2013.

 "Paradise City" – Tom Cruise
 "Sister Christian" / "Just Like Paradise" / "Nothin' but a Good Time" – Julianne Hough, Diego Boneta, Russell Brand, Alec Baldwin
 "Juke Box Hero" / "I Love Rock 'n' Roll" – Diego Boneta, Alec Baldwin, Russell Brand, Julianne Hough
 "Hit Me With Your Best Shot" – Catherine Zeta-Jones
 "Waiting for a Girl Like You" – Diego Boneta, Julianne Hough
 "More Than Words" / "Heaven" – Julianne Hough, Diego Boneta
 "Wanted Dead or Alive" – Tom Cruise, Julianne Hough
 "I Want to Know What Love Is" – Tom Cruise, Malin Åkerman
 "I Wanna Rock" – Diego Boneta
 "Pour Some Sugar on Me" – Tom Cruise
 "Harden My Heart" – Julianne Hough, Mary J. Blige
 "Shadows of the Night" / "Harden My Heart" – Mary J. Blige, Julianne Hough
 "Here I Go Again" – Diego Boneta, Paul Giamatti, Julianne Hough, Mary J. Blige, Tom Cruise
 "Can't Fight This Feeling" – Russell Brand, Alec Baldwin
 "Any Way You Want It" – Mary J. Blige, Constantine Maroulis, Julianne Hough
 "Undercover Love" – Diego Boneta
 "Every Rose Has Its Thorn" – Julianne Hough, Diego Boneta, Tom Cruise, Mary J. Blige
 "Rock You Like a Hurricane" – Julianne Hough, Tom Cruise
 "We Built This City" / "We're Not Gonna Take It" – Russell Brand, Catherine Zeta-Jones
 "Don't Stop Believin'" – Julianne Hough, Diego Boneta, Tom Cruise, Alec Baldwin, Russell Brand, Mary J. Blige

The following songs appear in the film as sung by the original artists. These songs do not appear on the official soundtrack.

Musical numbers

Certifications

References

External links
 
 
 
 
 

2012 films
2010s English-language films
2012 LGBT-related films
2010s musical comedy films
American LGBT-related films
American musical comedy films
American rock musicals
Films based on musicals
Films directed by Adam Shankman
Films produced by Tobey Maguire
Films set in 1987
Films set in Los Angeles
Films shot in Florida
Glam metal
IMAX films
Jukebox musical films
LGBT-related musical comedy films
Films with screenplays by Justin Theroux
New Line Cinema films
Warner Bros. films
2012 comedy films
Films about striptease
Films with screenplays by Allan Loeb
2010s American films